Land Force or Land Forces may refer to:

 Land forces, or army
 Albanian Land Force
 Azerbaijani Land Forces
 Bulgarian Land Forces
 Canadian Forces Land Force Command, the former name of the Canadian Army
 Czech Land Forces
 Estonian Land Forces
 Georgian Land Forces
 Land Forces of the Democratic Republic of the Congo
 Land Forces of the National People's Army, a former army branch in the German Democratic Republic
 Latvian Land Forces
 Lithuanian Land Force
 Multinational Land Force – Italy, with Hungary and Slovenia
 Polish Land Forces
 Romanian Land Forces
 Royal Brunei Land Forces
 Turkish Land Forces
 United Kingdom Land Forces, a former British Army command